February 10 - Eastern Orthodox liturgical calendar - February 12

All fixed commemorations below are observed on February 24 by Eastern Orthodox Churches on the Old Calendar.

For February 11th, Orthodox Churches on the Old Calendar commemorate the Saints listed on January 29.

Saints

 Hieromartyr Blaise, Bishop of Sebaste (316)
 The Holy 7 women martyrs and 2 youth, companions of Hieromartyr Blaise of Sebaste (316).
 Hieromartyr Lucius of Adrianople (348)
 Saint Theodora, wife of Emperor Theophilus the Iconoclast (867)
 Saint Blaise the Hieromartyr of Acarnania (Vlasios of Sklavaina) (1006)

Pre-Schism Western saints

 Saint Calocerus, a disciple of St Apollinaris, whom he succeeded as Bishop of Ravenna, Confessor (c. 130)  (see also: April 18; May 19)
 Martyrs of North-West Africa, the 'Guardians of the Holy Scriptures' (303)
 Martyrs Saturninus, Dativus, Felix, Ampelius, Victoria and Companions (304)  (see also: February 12 - Greek)
 Saint Lazarus of Milan, Archbishop of Milan, he defended his flock from the Ostrogoths.
 Saints Priscus the Bishop, with Castrensis, Tammarus, Rosius, Heraclius, Secundinus, Adjutor, Mark, Augustus, Elpidius, Canion and Vindonius, priests (5th century)
 Saint Severinus, a Burgundian who became the Abbot of Agaunum in Switzerland (507)
 Saint Desideratus (Désiré), successor of St Avitus as Bishop of Clermont in Auvergne in France (6th century)  (see also: February 10)
 Saint Desiderius, Bishop of Vienne and martyr (608)
 Saint Cædmon of Whitby, monk, hymnographer (c. 680)
 Saint Gobnait, abbess of Ballyvourney, Cork, Ireland (7th century)
 Saint Gregory II, Pope of Rome (731)
 Saint Benedict of Aniane, monastic reformer (821)

Post-Schism Orthodox saints

 Saint Gabriel of Pskov (Prince Vsevolod of Pskov), Prince and wonderworker of Pskov (1138)
 Venerable Demetrius, monk and wonderworker of Priluki Monastery in Vologda (1392)
 New Martyr George of Kratovo, at Sofia, burned at the stake (1515)
 Venerable Cassian the Barefoot (in the world 'Kosmas'), ascetic of the Joseph-Volokolamsk Monastery (1532)

Other commemorations

 Uncovering of the relics of Saint Zechariah, the father of St. John the Baptist (415)
 Repose of Archbishop Simon (Vinogradov) of Shanghai and Peking (1933)

Icon gallery

Notes

References

Sources
 February 11 / 24. Orthodox Calendar (Pravoslavie.ru).
 February 24 / 11. Holy Trinity Russian Orthodox Church (A parish of the Patriarchate of Moscow).
 February 11. OCA - The Lives of the Saints.
 The Autonomous Orthodox Metropolia of Western Europe and the Americas. St. Hilarion Calendar of Saints for the year of our Lord 2004. St. Hilarion Press (Austin, TX). p. 14.
 The Eleventh Day of the Month of February. Orthodoxy in China.
 February 11. Latin Saints of the Orthodox Patriarchate of Rome.
 The Roman Martyrology. Transl. by the Archbishop of Baltimore. Last Edition, According to the Copy Printed at Rome in 1914. Revised Edition, with the Imprimatur of His Eminence Cardinal Gibbons. Baltimore: John Murphy Company, 1916. pp. 44–45.
 Rev. Richard Stanton. A Menology of England and Wales, or, Brief Memorials of the Ancient British and English Saints Arranged According to the Calendar, Together with the Martyrs of the 16th and 17th Centuries. London: Burns & Oates, 1892. pp. 62–63.
Greek Sources
 Great Synaxaristes:  11 Φεβρουαριου. Μεγασ Συναξαριστησ.
  Συναξαριστής. 11 Φεβρουαρίου. Ecclesia.gr. (H Εκκλησια Τησ Ελλαδοσ).
Russian Sources
  24 февраля (11 февраля). Православная Энциклопедия под редакцией Патриарха Московского и всея Руси Кирилла (электронная версия). (Orthodox Encyclopedia - Pravenc.ru).

February in the Eastern Orthodox calendar